Walter Jones was a Welsh  Anglican priest in the mid 16th Century.

Jones was educated at the University of Oxford. He held livings at Hodgeston and Aberporth. He was  Archdeacon of Brecon from 1561 until 1567. He was then Rector of Long Marston until his death in 1577.

References

1577 deaths
Archdeacons of Brecon
16th-century Welsh Anglican priests
Alumni of the University of Oxford